Pingyin County is under the administration of Jinan, the capital of Shandong province, People's Republic of China.  The ancient Kingdom of Jibei was located to the northeast of present-day Pingyin County.

Pingyin has an area of 827 square kilometers and a population of 360,000.

Administrative divisions
As 2020, this county is divided to 2 subdistricts and 6 towns.
Subdistrict
Yushan Subdistrict
Jinshui Subdistrict
Towns

Climate

Transportation
China National Highway 220

Notes

References

External links
Official website of Pingyin County Government

Counties of Shandong
Jinan